The untitled Erin Foster project is an upcoming comedy series created by Erin Foster, and stars Kristen Bell. The series will be released on Netflix.

Development
On March 1, 2023, it was announced that Netflix had green-light a comedy series created by Erin Foster based loosely on Foster's real-life experiences. It was also announced that Kristen Bell will have a main role in the series, and Steven Levitan will co-executive produce the series with Foster and Bell.

The series will be executive produced by Erin Foster, Kristen Bell, Steven Levitan, Craig DiGregorio, Sara Foster, Danielle Stokdyk, and Oly Obst and Josh Lieberman for 3 Arts Entertainment. Production companies involved with this series are Steven Levitan Productions, 3 Arts Entertainment, and 20th Television.

References

External links
 

Upcoming Netflix original programming
American comedy television series
English-language television shows
Television series by Steven Levitan Productions
Television series by 3 Arts Entertainment
Television series by 20th Century Fox Television